Aftertones is the eighth album by American singer/songwriter Janis Ian, recorded 1975 in various New York studios and released 1976 by Columbia Records. "Love Is Blind" was a #1 single in Japan for six months.  It was the highest-selling album by a solo female artist in Japan and was also a top twenty and gold record in the United States, Ireland and Holland. "I Would Like to Dance" reached #86 in Canada.

Track listing

Charts

Personnel

Janis Ian – vocals, guitar, piano
Jeff Layton, Al Gorgoni, Bucky Pizzarelli – guitar
Stu Woods, Richard Davis – bass guitar
Barry Lazarowitz – percussion
Arthur Jenkins – congas
Claire Bay, Brooks Arthur, Odetta, V. Martin Fink – vocals
Phoebe Snow – obligato vocals on "Hymn"
Larry Spencer, Pete Nater, Tom Malone, Ernie Royal, Joe Shepley – trumpet
Mickey Gravine, Lewis Kahn, Wayne Andre – trombone
Donald Corrado, Earl Chapin, Jim Buffington – French horn
Charles McCracken, Jesse Levy, Bruce Rogers, Kermit Moore, Max Hollander – cello
Ezra Kliger, Gene Orloff, Julius Schacter, Kathryn Kienke, Harry Cykman, Harry Lookofsky, Michael Comins, Paul Winter – violin
Emanuel Vardi, Eugenie Dengel, George Brown, David Sackson, Jennifer Ward Clarke – viola
Gonzalo Fernandez – wooden flute on "I Would Like to Dance"
George Young – tenor saxophone on "Belle of the Blues"
Artie Kaplan – baritone saxophone on "Belle of the Blues"; bass clarinet on "Don't Cry, Old Man"
Phil Bodner – oboe, alto flute, English horn on "Goodbye to Morning"
Romeo Penque – oboe, alto flute, piccolo flue, English horn on "Goodbye to Morning"; contrabass clarinet on "Don't Cry, Old Man"
Mike Gibson – arranger, conductor on "I Would Like to Dance"
Jerry Ragovoy – arranger, conductor on "Belle of the Blues"
Ron Frangipane – arranger, conductor on "Don't Cry, Old Man"

Production
Produced by Brooks Arthur
Album photography: Peter Cunningham
Album design: David L’Heureux

External links

References

Janis Ian albums
1976 albums
Columbia Records albums
Albums produced by Brooks Arthur